Market Building or Old Market Building may refer to:

Market Building (Clarkesville, Georgia), listed on the NRHP in Georgia
Worcester Market Building, Worcester, MA, listed on the NRHP in Massachusetts
Broadway Market Building, Asheville, NC, listed on the NRHP in North Carolina
Findlay Market Building, Cincinnati, OH, listed on the NRHP in Ohio
Italian Gardeners and Ranchers Association Market Building, Portland, OR, listed on the NRHP in Oregon
South Side Market Building, Pittsburgh, PA, listed on the NRHP in Pennsylvania
Old Market Building (Georgetown, South Carolina), listed on the NRHP in South Carolina
Market Building, Penzance, England